Min-ji, also spelled Min-jee, is a Korean feminine given name. Its meaning differs based on the hanja used to write each syllable of the name. There are 27 hanja with the reading min and 46 hanja with the reading ji on the South Korean government's official list of hanja which may be used in given names. Min-ji was the fourth-most popular name for baby girls born in South Korea in 1990.

Notable people
People with this name include:

Entertainers
Yeon Min-ji (born Lee Min-ji, 1984), South Korean actress
Jung Min-ji (born 1988), South Korean actress
Lee Min-ji (actress, born 1988), South Korean actress
Park Min-ji (born 1989), South Korean actress
Lee Min-ji (Miss Korea) (born 1991), South Korean beauty pageant titleholder
Won Min-ji (born 1991), stage name Anda, South Korean singer
Kim Min-ji (actress) (born 1992), South Korean actress
Gong Min-ji (born 1994), stage name Minzy, South Korean singer and former member of girl group 2NE1

Sportspeople
Shim Min-ji (born 1983), South Korean swimmer
Oh Min-ji (born 1985), South Korean speed skater who competed at the 2010 Winter Olympics
Kim Min-jee (speed skater) (born 1986), South Korean speed skater, gold medallist at the 2003 Asian Winter Games
Kim Min-ji (sport shooter) (born 1989), South Korean sport shooter
Um Min-ji (born 1991), South Korean curler who competed at the 2013 Pacific-Asia Curling Championships
Yeo Min-ji (born 1993), South Korean football player
Kim Min-ji (volleyball) (born 1995), South Korean volleyball player
Minjee Lee (born 1996), Australian golfer of Korean descent
Ji Min-ji (born 1999), South Korean pair skater
Kim Min-ji (curler), South Korean curler who competed at the 2016 World Junior Curling Championships

See also
List of Korean given names

References

Korean feminine given names